"Voice in the Night" was also an episode in Alfred Hitchcock's TV series Suspicion adapted from The Voice in the Night, a short story by William Hope Hodgson

Voice in the Night is an album by jazz saxophonist Charles Lloyd recorded in May 1998 by Lloyd with John Abercrombie, Dave Holland and Billy Higgins.

Reception
The Allmusic review by Thom Jurek awarded the album 4 stars and states "Lloyd was going for more of a jazz sound, something more basic and lyrical as opposed to exotic and unusual". The All About Jazz review by Larry Koenigsberg stated "the most notable feature of his new CD is his return to form, as opposed to merely a return to format. He sounds the best he has since he left his Big Sur retreat to perform and record for ECM".

In another review for the same website Douglas Payne stated "Lloyd seems to sound warmer, somewhat romantic - and a touch more inspired than usual... This is a quartet that offers much to explore".

Track listing
All compositions by Charles Lloyd except as indicated

 "Voice in the Night" - 6:30
 "God Give Me Strength" (Burt Bacharach, Elvis Costello) - 4:45
 "Dorothea's Studio" - 7:47
 "Requiem" - 5:57
 "Pocket Full of Blues" - 11:41
 "Homage" - 9:26
 "Forest Flower: Sunrise/Sunset" - 15:22
 "A Flower Is a Lovesome Thing" (Billy Strayhorn) - 6:49

Personnel
Charles Lloyd - tenor saxophone
John Abercrombie - guitar
Dave Holland - double bass
Billy Higgins - drums, percussion

References

1999 albums
ECM Records albums
Charles Lloyd (jazz musician) albums
Albums produced by Manfred Eicher